Sergey Vasilyevich Gerasimov (– 20 April 1964) was a Soviet and Russian painter.

Gerasimov was a student of artist Konstantin Korovin, and as a young artist he later went on to join the Makovets group. His early watercolors are considered masterpieces and show a tendency toward modernism that is less pronounced in his later work. In the 1920s and 1930s, he taught at the state art school Vkhutemas, and designed posters and painted works sympathetic to the new Communist government in a style later known as Socialist realism.

Despite this he was known throughout the Russian art world to be a liberal thinker whose paintings showed the influences of Impressionism and other modern movements. Under Joseph Stalin these tendencies placed him in aesthetic opposition to his nemesis (and ironic namesake) Aleksandr Gerasimov.

During the Stalin era, Sergey Gerasimov was demoted from his position of director of the Russian Artists' Union and replaced by Aleksandr Gerasimov. During the period of World War II, Sergey Gerasimov, along with most of the faculty and student body of the Surikov Art Institute were moved from Moscow to the ancient caravan city of Samarkand.

Some of Gerasimov's most famous works were painted during this period and show scenes of the old oriental city of Samarkand. Many of these paintings are on display to this day at the Tretyakov Gallery in Moscow. With the death of Stalin and the rise of Nikita Khrushchev, Sergey Gerasimov was re-instated as the head of the Russian Artists' Union, a position he held until his death in 1964.

Some of Gerasimov's most famous students that he came in contact with and taught at the Surikov Art Institute include; Fedor Z. Zakharov, Vladimir Stozharov, Alexey and Sergey Tkachyov, Yury P. Kugach, Aleksei Gritsai, Gely Korzhev, and many other important Soviet artists.

Selected works

External links

Gerasimov, Sergey Vasilyevich

1885 births
1964 deaths
20th-century Russian painters
People from Mozhaysk
Communist Party of the Soviet Union members
Academic staff of Vkhutemas
People's Artists of the USSR (visual arts)
Lenin Prize winners
Recipients of the Order of the Red Banner of Labour
Russian genre painters
Russian illustrators
Russian Impressionist painters
Russian landscape painters
Russian male painters
Russian portrait painters
Soviet painters
Burials at Novodevichy Cemetery